This article lists political parties in Nauru.
In Nauru, political parties do not play a major a role, as in many countries with parliamentary systems, but they have been formed. Officially, however, Nauru remains a non-party democracy.

As the parliamentary website puts it, "Nauru does not have a political party system, so all members of Parliament are effectively independent members. Whilst it is usual for members to form groups, the absence of party discipline means that such groups have often been fluid and subject to change during the term of a Parliament".

The parties
{| class="wikitable"
|+
!Name (English)
!Name (Nauran)
!Acronym
!Leader
!Political position & ideologies
|-
|Democratic Party of Nauru
| -
|DPN
|David Adeang
| -
|-
|Nauru First Party
|Naoero Amo
|NFP
|Several
|Liberalism
Christian democracy
|-
|Centre Party
| -
|CP
|Kinza Clodumar
| -
|}

Former Parties

See also
 Politics of Nauru
 List of political parties by country

References

Nauru
 
Nauru
Political parties
Parties